Upper Manya is one of the constituencies represented in the Parliament of Ghana. It elects one Member of Parliament (MP) by the first past the post system of election. Upper Manya is located in the Manya Krobo district  of the Eastern Region of Ghana.

Boundaries
The seat is located within the Manya Krobo District of the Eastern Region of Ghana.

Members of Parliament

Elections

See also
List of Ghana Parliament constituencies

Parliamentary constituencies in the Eastern Region (Ghana)